The Cuban baseball league system is not a single baseball league; rather it is a structure of leagues and series that are governed by the Baseball Federation of Cuba and culminate in national championships and the selection of the Cuba national baseball team.

The players are professionals and play for the provinces in which they reside. All of the provinces in Cuba are represented by teams.

Organization of Cuban national baseball system

Cuban National Series

The National Series generally runs from March to July (beginning with the 2022 season) with a schedule of 98 games per team in the regular season. The series is then followed by 3 playoff rounds culminating in a championship. This series has been played each winter since 1961-62 until the 2020-21 season, and was moved to the spring in 2022. There are 16 teams organized in a West League and an East League. The top four teams from each league advance to a playoff, with the winner crowned in the championship series. Two teams have dominated the National Series in recent years: Industriales and Santiago de Cuba.

Cuban Elite League 

Created in 2022, the Elite League took over the former winter schedule that had been dominated by the National Series since its foundation season. It runs from October to February with a similar schedule and format as the CNS, with the winner of the championship series after the postseason playoffs assuming the role as Cuban representative to the Caribbean Series. From 2014 to 2019, the CNS champion team advanced directly to the Caribbean Series proper.

Super Series
The Super Series, a summer league, is usually played from May through July with a schedule of about 28 games. The series is followed by a playoff between the two top teams. Its teams are selected from the best players of the National Series. In turn, the Cuba national baseball team is selected from the players in the Super Series. Five regional teams compete:
Occidentales (Western region)
Havana
Centrales (Central region)
Orientales (Eastern region)
Santiago de Cuba

History of the Cuban baseball league system

Prior to the Cuban Revolution, various professional, semiprofessional, industrial, and amateur baseball leagues and teams flourished in Cuba, including the professional Cuban League and the minor league Havana Sugar Kings.

Since the Cuban Revolution, baseball continued to thrive as Cuba's national game. In February 1961 the government created the National Institute for Sports, Physical Education, and Recreation (INDER) and in March, after the close of the 1960–61 Cuban League season, it decreed the abolition of professional baseball and plans to hold a national amateur championship. Thus, the National Series was conceptualized to serve as the national league circuit. Opening Day for the new league was slated for fall 1961.

The first National Series season 1961–62, included four charter teams: Occidentales, Orientales, Habana, and Azucareros. The next season the number of teams had increased to six, and in 1967 to 12. The expansion of baseball to the provinces was accompanied by the construction of new stadiums in provincial capitals, bringing first-tier baseball to the provincial population. This expansion greatly enhanced the nationwide accessibility of top-flight baseball. The two new Havana-based teams, Industriales and Habana (renamed in the 1970s to Metropolitanos), were similar to the old professional Cuban League rivals, Almendares and Habana in that Industriales, like Almendares, wore blue, while Habana/Metropolitanos, like Habana, wore red. However, after Industriales went on to capture four consecutive championships from 1963–66, they became known as the premier Cuban team. Metropolitanos after the '80s, on the other hand, was unable to be competitive and has failed to re-establish the rivalry; it is now considered a second-class team, where young players and fading veterans share playing time.

Several individuals were important in the transition to post-revolutionary baseball. Gilberto Torres managed the early national team and conveyed his vast knowledge of the game to the new generation of amateur players. Natilla Jiménez managed several provincial teams and was pitching coach of the national team. Juan Vistuer, Asdrúbal Baró, and Pedro Chávez also were prominent transitional coaches and managers. Conrado Marrero (former pitcher with the Washington Senators) remained in Cuba where he was a pitching coach for several teams.

The Cuban baseball system is designed as much to develop the nation's athletic talents as to provide entertainment to the public. Children showing athletic promise are sent to sports academies for extensive competitive training and development, with the goal of developing the nation's athletes. Some players are able to make the municipal team and advance through the sport without training in the academies, but those players are exceptional. Although players are amateurs, elite players are subsidized and given special rewards. A problem confronting Cuba's top athletes, however, is the lack of opportunities to compete against the best players in the world. 

An opportunity for competition against the world's best professional players was finally made available by the World Baseball Classic first held in March . In 2014, representation in the Caribbean Series, last made in 1960, was finally restored.

Some other memorable events in the history of the Cuban national baseball system are the following:
On 16 January and 25 January 1966, right-hander Aquino Abreu pitched back-to-back no-hitters (against Occidentals and Industriales), matching a feat accomplished by major-leaguer Johnny Vander Meer.
On 13 August 1966 José Ramón López established an all-time season record of 309 strikeouts. Although López struck out 12 batters, he lost the game 2–0.
 On 12 April 1980, two players from the same team, Rey Vicente Anglada and Jorge Beltrán of Habana, hit grand slams in one inning. Remarkably, on the same day major leaguers Cecil Cooper and Don Money of the Milwaukee Brewers accomplished the same feat.
In 1985 Lázaro Vargas of Industriales set the Cuban National Series record for consecutive-game hitting streak by hitting safely in 31 straight games.
In 1990 all-time Cuban great Omar Linares hit better than .400 for the third time to win his third batting title. Linares is widely considered to be one of the greatest third basemen of all time.
In March 1994 Lázaro Junco wins his eighth home run title. Junco retired with the career record of 405 home runs (later surpassed by Orestes Kindelán).
On 28 March 1999 the Baltimore Orioles are the first Major League team in 40 years to play in Cuba, playing against the Cuba national baseball team before 55,000 fans in Latin American Stadium in Havana.

In 2015, the Under-23 division of the Cuban National Series began its debut season, with its players being below 23 years of age.

In 2022, INDER and the BFC officially ended the long monopoly of the National Series as the sole national baseball circuit, beginning that year the Cuban Elite League was launched as the country's fall baseball circuit with the NS now moved to the spring, in competition with Major League Baseball and the Mexican League.

Emigrants

A number of immigrants from Cuba (sometimes described as "defectors") have played for the major leagues. Immediately after the Cuban Revolution many of the former professional baseball players emigrated, but for the next 30 years relatively few left Cuba. Since 1991, however, a number of prominent Cuban baseball players have emigrated.

See also

Baseball in Cuba

References

External links
Baseball in Cuba
PBS Program: Stealing Home
Joe Connor on Cuba baseball: At a crisis stage?
Baseball Federation of Cuba 

 
Sports league systems

de:Baseball in Kuba
es:Béisbol de Cuba